Steven Reigns (born 1975) is an American poet, artist and activist known for his poetry publications, his work as West Hollywood's first City Poet, his participatory art projects, his LGBT activism, and his scholarly work on Anaïs Nin.

Biography

Early years
Reigns grew up in the suburbs of St. Louis, Missouri. From an early age, he sought refuge from a troubled home life in local libraries where he discovered the writers who would have a huge impact on his own work: Sapphire, Essex Hemphill, Dorothy Allison, Edmund White, Anaïs Nin, Amy Scholder, John Preston and Audre Lorde.

Career

Reigns graduated from the University of South Florida, where he wrote a bi-monthly column for TLW magazine, with a degree in Creative Writing. He also has a Masters in Clinical Psychology from Antioch University.

Reigns is a fourteen-time recipient of the Los Angeles County Department of Cultural Affairs' Artist in Residency Grant. He was elected as West Hollywood's inaugural City Poet for a two-year term beginning in October 2014. He was selected as "Someone to Watch in 2015" by The Advocate Magazine. Reigns was selected for a City of Los Angeles Individual Artist Fellowship in 2020.

Library Activism

Reigns has cited public libraries and librarians as a major influence on his development as an artist and activist.  He has campaigned in support of gay, lesbian, bisexual and queer programming in libraries.

In 2004 he organized 'Loving in Fear', an LGBQT literary event in response to Hillsborough County's lack of gay, lesbian, bisexual or queer programming. He recounted the experience in a Watermark Magazine article about National Library Week. He was the first to speak to the commissioners about their discriminatory policy at the library.

He was Literary Director for The Gay, Lesbian, Bisexual Center of Tampa for two years.

Reigns has been keynote speaker at Rollins College, Stonewall Library, and at the American Library Associations Annual Breakfast. He facilitates the monthly Lambda Literary Foundation Book Club.

HIV/AIDS Activism

Reigns worked as a certified (in Florida and California) HIV test counselor for over 10 years, testing more than 9000 people. He contributed to a panel with Los Angeles County on standards of care for HIV.  In 2011, he ran a support group that utilized film as a projective tool at Being Alive.

In 2012, he published an essay in Frontiers Magazine on the need for new AIDS narratives in cinema and literature. He published a poem about the so-called AIDS "Patient Zero" Gaëtan Dugas and in 2018 hosted an event at West Hollywood Council Chambers discussing Dugas’ legacy.

Reigns participated in a staged conversation about Keith Haring with Ann Magnuson at The Broad for World AIDS Day 2022.

Artistic Projects

The Gay Rub

Reigns created The Gay Rub, a participatory art project in 2011 and has curated the project ever since. The Gay Rub is a collection of rubbings taken from historically significant LGBTQ public markers, memorials, and monuments. Participants from around the world contribute rubbings of markers from their home city, along with commentary. There are currently more than 200 rubbings in the collection, which has toured major universities. The collection is the subject of The Gay Rub: A Documentary (2018) by Michael J. Saul.

Other Art Projects 
Reigns has participated in several collaborative online projects, such as Heather Champs' Mirror Project and Anni Holm's Getting My Name Out There.
He was also a character in Hilary Goldberg's In The Spotlight.

His artwork has been shown in galleries throughout the U.S.A including at The Advocate gallery part of Rainbow Gobblins exhibit in May 2007.

From 2007 to 2014, Reigns undertook a 7 years living/art project under the mentorship of Linda Montano, S(t)even Years.

Audio-visual Media
Reigns and his work have been featured in a variety of other media, including:
 Cameo appearances as a "homo hommie" in Jonny McGovern's video Dickmatized  and as a partier in Texting on the Dance Floor 
 Co-host of IMRU Radio, the nations longest running LGBT radio show  With some of his segments airing nationally on This Way Out
 Dean Littner directed a 64 min documentary on the My Life is Poetry Class  
 His poem Domicilium  was put to music and performed by One Voice Chorus in North Carolina  
 Two poems by Reigns are used in Hunter Lee Hughes' black-and-white feature film Guys Reading Poems. Reigns is only one of two living poets whose work was used in the film.  Recipe Box and Put Your Head on my Shoulder, both from his second collection Inheritance, are featured in the film
 Lines from Reigns’ poem Morning, West Hollywood were incorporated into vinyl art banners hung in the West Hollywood City Hall Community Plaza in 2016. Reigns collaborated with artist MONCHO1929 for this project
 Reigns was featured in Jenny Holzer’s SPEECH ITSELF (2022), a series of large-scale projections on the facades of 30 Rockefeller Plaza, 610 Fifth Avenue, and 620 Fifth Avenue. SPEECH ITSELF marked the centenary of PEN America.

Scholarly work
Reigns is an Anaïs Nin scholar and has presented at The Sapphire Symposium.

Anaïs Nin Scholarship
Reigns discovered Nin’s poetry at the age of sixteen and her work has had a profound influence on his career. In February 2008, Reigns organized ‘Anaïs Nin@105’ at the Hammer Museum.  Reigns said, "Nin bonded and formed very deep friendships with women and men decades younger than her. Some of them are still living in Los Angeles and I thought it'd be wonderful to have them share their experiences with (Nin)." Electronic musician Bebe Barron, who was championed by Nin early in her career, made her last public appearance at ‘Anaïs Nin@105’.  Reigns spoke at Barron's memorial.

Reigns combed through Nin's original diaries to investigate the validity of Bern Porter's claims of his sexual relationship in the 1930s with Anaïs Nin, which were published as a series of interviews in the 1990s.  Reigns' essay refuting Porter's claims, Bern Porter's Wild Sexual Life with Anais Nin or Wild Imaginings? was published in Café in Space and Thinking of Anaïs Nin.

Reigns' poem 'Anaïs Nin Never Bought a Car' was published in Divining Divas: 100 Gay Poets on Their Muses (2012).

Reigns facilitated the 2010 re-release of a long out-of-circulation audio book by Nin. Reigns loaned his rare 1949 pink vinyl version of Nin reading her prose poem House of Incest, recorded by Louis and Bebe Barron, to their son Adam Barron. Adam Barron used it as the basis for a CD release.

Reigns owns a large collection of Nin memorabilia and ephemera, including a copy of Marcel Proust's Albertine disparue, once owned by Nin. In the book are lines underlined by Henry Miller with notes written in the margin by both Nin and Miller.

Reigns organized and curated Anais Nin's Influence: Women who Knew Nin Talk About her Writing, Her Life and Their Friendship with Her at the West Hollywood Library in 2015. Reigns said of Nin and the event: "The struggles of life, love, and artistry Nin documented in detail daily. Her life and writings are more relevant now than ever. Hearing firsthand from women who Nin is an exceptional experience."

In January 2016, Reigns co-produced an event at Antioch University Santa Barbara, The Allure of Anaïs Nin. He serves on the Anaïs Nin Foundation Board.

Teaching

Reigns has taught writing workshops throughout his career. He began by teaching to LGBT youth groups across the United States, followed by workshops for HIV+ people,. He has taught poetry to LGBT Seniors at Los Angeles LGBT Center for many years. This workshop My Life is Poetry was the first of its kind in the country and resulted in a book of the students' writings edited by Reigns. As part of his tenure as West Hollywood City Poet, he taught free writing workshops for National Poetry Month in West Hollywood, CA.  Filmmaker Dean Littner made a documentary about the 2013 My Life Is Poetry reading by Reigns' students.

Publications

A Quilt For David 
A Quilt for David (City Lights Books, 2021) ISBN 9780872868816

A Quilt For David explores the life of Florida dentist David J. Acer, who in 1990 was accused of infecting a patient (Kimberly Bergalis) with HIV. Reigns describes the work as “investigative poetry” as it is based on extensive research into Acer’s life and death, including interviews with those who knew him, as it played out against the AIDS hysteria of the late 1980s and early 1990s. In his poetry, Reigns challenges the media narrative of the time, which was that Acer infected his patients deliberately.

Other Poetry Publications 
Reigns has published two other books of poetry.

Your Dead Body is My Welcome Mat (2001) 
Inheritance (2011) 

Inheritance was selected by Lambda Literary Foundation's My Story Book Club.

Reigns has also published chapbooks: 
Ignited (2006) 
Cartography (2007) 
Stu (2014)

His poetry is included in Velvet Mafia, a poetry chapbook on gay and lesbian response to war, Outside the Green Zone. Reigns was featured as Mr. November in the Most Intriguing and Sensual Male Poet Calendar(2006).  
 
In June 2008, Reigns edited the anthology My Life is Poetry, a book of autobiographical poetry by gay, lesbian, and bisexual seniors created by those attending his workshops of the same name. The poems are accompanied by photographic portraits by Jenny Walters. The preface was written by Dorothy Allison.

In July 2015, Reigns edited 3-Pack Jack, a three book set based on his 2013 curation of the Apt3F performance series at Akbar, Los Angeles.

Other Work

 Reigns wrote an article in defense of transgender writer and activist Kate Bornstein 
 Reigns' short storyOn These Sheets is included in the Foolish Hearts anthology a Rainbow Book Finalist

Reigns' papers are held by the ONE National Gay and Lesbian Archives at USC Libraries.

References

See also

Official Steven Reigns Web-site

1975 births
American male poets
Living people
American LGBT poets
American gay writers
Poets from Missouri
Writers from St. Louis
21st-century American poets
21st-century American male writers
Gay poets